Acrocercops tricirrha is a moth of the family Gracillariidae. It is known from Indonesia (Java).

The larvae feed on Persicaria chinensis. They probably mine the leaves of their host plant.

References

tricirrha
Moths of Asia
Moths described in 1935